Ditak may refer to:
 Ditak, Armenia, a village in Armenia
 Triamterene, by trade name Ditak